Baosteel Group Guangdong Shaoguan Iron and Steel Co., Ltd. known as Shaoguan Iron and Steel or SGIS or Shaogang or Shaosteel (formerly Shaoguan Iron and Steel Group) is a Chinese steel maker.

Structure 
The company was registered in Guangzhou, Guangdong, but the general office is located in Maba, Qujiang District, Shaoguan, Guangdong. SGIS Group is the parent company of SGIS Songshan Co., Ltd. for 53.37% stake, which most of the group assets and revenue came from.

History
The steel plant in Shaogang, Guangdong was established in 1966 (as ). In 1989 the plant was marketized as a company and was subsequently renamed into Guangdong Shaoguan Iron and Steel Group Corporation in December 1993. In December 1996, it became Guangdong Shaoguan Iron and Steel Group Co., Ltd. Shaoguan Iron and Steel was one of the most 512 important state-owned enterprises in 1997. In early 2000, the enterprise was among 120 companies selected in a pilot project aimed at rapidly improving their international competitiveness.

Subsidiaries 
In 1997 Shaoguan Iron and Steel Group was split into 5 main subsidiaries: SGIS Songshan (incorporated on 29 April 1997), "Chung Shan Investment & Development" ("Chung Shan Development" in short), "Shaoguan Iron and Steel Co., Ltd.", and two other subsidiaries. In the same year the shares of SGIS Songshan were floated at the Shenzhen Stock Exchange.

In 2008, an agreement was signed with Baosteel Group that 100% shares of Shaoguan Iron and Steel Group and  would be injected into "Guangdong Iron and Steel Group" as share capital. As a result, the State-owned Assets Supervision and Administration Commissions (SASACs) of Guangdong Province and Guangzhou City respectively, would come to own a combined 20% stake in Guangdong Iron and Steel Group. However, the deal collapsed.

In 2011, a 51% stake of Shaoguan Iron and Steel Group was transferred from SASAC of Guangdong Province to Baosteel Group, a steel conglomerate and supervised by the central government's  SASAC.

In September 2012, the remaining 49% were transferred to a wholly owned subsidiary of Guangdong SASAC, namely Guangdong Hengjian Investment Holding.

In December 2012, the company was once more renamed into Baosteel Group Guangdong Shaoguan Iron and Steel Co., Ltd..

In June 2013 SGIS Group subscribed  capital increase of SGIS Songshan for  each (750 million shares). In September 2015 the group bought back 0.32% shares (approx. 7.7 million in number) for a weighed-average of  each.

Financial data

Shareholders
 State-owned Assets Supervision and Administration Commission of the State Council
 China Baowu Steel Group (51%)
 State-owned Assets Supervision and Administration Commission of Guangdong Provincial People's Government
 Hengjian Holding (49%)

Subsidiaries
 Chung Shan Investment & Development (100%)
 SGIS Songshan (53.37%)
 Shaoguan Iron and Steel (70.00% directly; 22.15% via Chung Shan Investment & Development and 7.85% by Guangdong Assets Management (BVI) No.4 Limited)

Footnotes

References

External links
 Official website of SGIS Songshan

Steel companies of China
Companies owned by the provincial government of China
Companies based in Guangdong
Manufacturing companies based in Guangzhou
Organizations established in 1966
Chinese companies established in 1989
Chinese brands
Baowu
Government-owned companies of China
Chinese companies established in 1966
1966 establishments in China